S. D. S. Somaratne was a Ceylonese lawyer and a film producer. He was the Deputy President of the Senate of Ceylon.

References

Alumni of Ceylon Law College
Ceylonese proctors
Members of the Senate of Ceylon